The 1953–54 Sussex County Football League season was the 29th in the history of the competition.

Division 1 featured now increased to fifteen teams with Wigmore Athletic being promoted from Division 2. Division 2 featured eleven teams from which the winners would be promoted into Division 1.

Division One
The division featured 15 clubs, 14 which competed in the last season, along with one new club, promoted from last season's Division Two: 
 Wigmore Athletic

League table

Division Two
The division featured 11 clubs which competed in the last season, no new clubs joined the league this season. 
Three Bridges added United to the club name.

League table

References

1953-54
9